The Mănăstirea is a left tributary of the river Gârboveta in Romania. It flows into the Gârboveta in Dagâța.

References

Rivers of Romania
Rivers of Iași County